The Eastern Land Division is one of five cadastral land divisions Western Australia, Australia, within the eastern parts of the Goldfields-Esperance region and the Pilbara region. Most of its territory is covered by deserts, including the part of the Great Sandy Desert, Gibson Desert and Great Victoria Desert.

History 
The Eastern Land Division was created on 2 March 1887, in a reform to the land divisions. On 28 March 1917, the Central Land Division had been incorporated into the Eastern Land Division. The current boundaries of the land enacted on 30 March 1998.

Prior to the construction of the Trans-Australian Railway in 1917, the Eastern Land Division, which consists almost entirely of the Great Victoria and Great Sandy Deserts, did not contain any districts.

Subdivisions 
The Eastern Land Division is subdivided into 40 land districts.

References 

Land divisions of Western Australia
States and territories established in 1887